Bowersville is an unincorporated community in Jefferson County, in the U.S. state of Pennsylvania.

History
A post office was established at Bowersville in 1903, and remained in operation until 1929.

Geography
 Bowersville's elevation is 1,821 feet.

References

https://pennsylvania.hometownlocator.com/pa/jefferson/bowersville.cfm

Unincorporated communities in Jefferson County, Pennsylvania
Unincorporated communities in Pennsylvania